Scientology Network is an American television network and streaming service launched by the Church of Scientology in 2018.

History 

In 2011, the Church of Scientology acquired the KCET Studios property, a 4.5 acre parcel with 300,000 square feet of facility which included two sound stages, post-production facilities, offices, and a satellite uplink. The studios, located at 4401 Sunset Blvd in Los Angeles, California, are a cultural landmark in Hollywood that dates back to 1912. In 1978, the property had been designated a Los Angeles Historic-Cultural Monument. When KCET split from PBS, they sold the studio property for $45 million with leaseback, remaining for another year. 

The Church of Scientology says they spent a further $50 million on renovations and upgrades on the facility which was slated to be the "centralized global communications hub for the church's media activities, which include public service announcements, television programming, advertisements, magazines, brochures, internet and every other conceivable type of content." The grand opening was held in May 2016 with its new name "Scientology Media Productions".

The network  

The Church of Scientology announced that Scientology Network would launch on March 12, 2018 and be available on DirecTV channel 320, Apple TV, Roku, Amazon Fire TV, iTunes, Google Play, and the website Scientology.tv. As of 2021, it was also available on Google Chromecast and aired in 17 languages.

The network is dedicated to Scientology topics and broadcasts such shows as Meet a Scientologist and L. Ron Hubbard: In His Own Voice.

Response 

According to Variety, the "Scientology Network appears to be another example of a well-heeled brand sidestepping traditional media and advertising platforms for a direct-to-consumer approach with a 24/7 TV channel to spread its message."

Depicting something "in between a self-help seminar, an infomercial, and a drug commercial", Vox describes the channel as showing little of Scientology techniques or terminology but instead offering a series of very similar programs, mostly interviews with people who have already chosen Scientology contrasted with images depicting the downsides of modern life without Scientology. Vox further laments, the channel is an "intersection of capitalism and spirituality that has come to define the American religious landscape."

A Vice writer said the network was supposed to convey the principles of Scientology, but he instead found it confusing, jargon-heavy, contradictory, repetitive and boring, and certain claims by Scientology got grander and vaguer. For example, in one show the "implication was that Scientology is the reason that the rioting that happened in Ferguson didn't spread nationwide" or in the case of the Colombian conflict "as the result of Scientologists giving talks and handing out literature on the importance of human rights, crime dropped and complaints against the military—who had previously been murdering civilians—fell 96 percent." The reviewer stated that the shows themselves are basically commercials for Scientology, which would have commercial breaks showing commercials for more commercials.

Quartz media said, "Unfortunately for Scientology, the church picked literally the worst time to get into the TV game. The number of cable and streaming TV channels and series has increased exponentially in recent years—making it harder and harder for brands to stick out in the era of 'peak TV'."

References

Further reading

External links

Scientology and the Internet
Scientology and society
Religious television networks
Religious television stations in the United States
2018 establishments in California
Television channels and stations established in 2018
Internet television channels